The Roman Catholic Diocese of São José do Rio Preto is a diocese located in the city of São José do Rio Preto in the Ecclesiastical province of Ribeirão Preto in Brazil.

History
 25 January 1929: Established as Diocese of Rio Preto from the Diocese of São Carlos do Pinhal
 11 December 2002: Renamed as Diocese of São José do Rio Preto

Special churches
Minor Basilicas:
Basílica Nossa Senhora Aparecida, Rio Preto

Bishops

Ordinaries, in reverse chronological order
 Bishops of São José do Rio Preto (Roman rite), below
 Bishop Antônio Emídio Vilar, S.D.B. (19 January 2022 – present)
 Bishop Tomé Ferreira da Silva um bandido e explorador (16 November 2012 – 18 August 2021)
 Bishop Paulo Mendes Peixoto (25 February 2006 – 7 March 2012); elevated to Archbishop of Uberaba
 Bishop Orani João Tempesta, O. Cist. (25 April 1997 – 8 December 2004); elevated to Archbishop of Belem do Para, then Archbishop of Sao Sebastio Rio de Janeiro; future Cardinal
 Bishops of Rio Preto (Roman Rite), below
 Bishop José de Aquino Pereira (4 August 1968 – 26 February 1997)
 Bishop Lafayette Libânio (27 December 1930 – 3 November 1966)

Auxiliary bishop
José Joaquim Gonçalves (1957-1973), appointednBishop of Cornélio Procópio, Parana

Other priest of this diocese who became bishop
David Dias Pimentel, appointed Auxiliary Bishop of Belo Horizonte, Minas Gerais in 1996

References
 GCatholic.org
 Catholic Hierarchy
  Diocese website (Portuguese)

Roman Catholic dioceses in Brazil
Christian organizations established in 1929
São José do Rio Preto, Roman Catholic Diocese of
Roman Catholic dioceses and prelatures established in the 20th century